Piero Floriani was an Italian professor and politician.

He was a professor of philology and Italian literature at Pisa University.

Member of the Democratic Party of the Left, he served as Mayor of Pisa from 24 November 1994 to 14 December 1998.

See also
1994 Italian local elections
List of mayors of Pisa

References

External links
 
 

1942 births
2018 deaths
Mayors of Pisa
Democratic Party of the Left politicians